was a Japanese shōnen manga magazine published by Fujimi Shobo. It was first released on January 30, 2006, and was initially sold quarterly. Starting with the sale of the fourth volume on April 20, 2007, the magazine was sold bimonthly until its final issue, the fifteenth volume released on February 20, 2009. The magazine was a special edition of its parent magazine Monthly Dragon Age which also publishes light novels along with manga.

Serialized titles

Manga
 @ Home
 Armored Core: Tower City Blade
 bee-be-beat it!
 Chrome Shelled Regios
 Clannad: Tomoyo Dearest
 Crimson Grave
 Croisée in a Foreign Labyrinth
 Diebuster
 Dolls Girl
 Hime no Namida wa Todomaranai
 Kanon
 Maken-ki!
 Maid o Nerae!
 Mei no Naisho
 Munto
 Nightly Knight
 Orichalcum Reycal
 Otome no Iroha
 Room No.1301
 Seitokai no Ichizon
 Supa Supa
 Tetsunagi Kooni
 Tomoyo After: Dear Shining Memories
 Yūgengaisha Kobold Shiritsutanteisha

Light novels
 Gakkō Yōkai Kikō Daihachi Kaidan Bashūchū

External links
 Official website 

2006 establishments in Japan
2009 disestablishments in Japan
Bi-monthly manga magazines published in Japan
Defunct magazines published in Japan
Fujimi Shobo
Magazines established in 2006
Magazines disestablished in 2009
Magazines published in Tokyo
Quarterly manga magazines published in Japan